Handwalla Bwana (born June 25, 1999) is a Somali professional footballer who plays as a winger for USL Championship club Charleston Battery.

Early life
Bwana was born a Somali refugee in Mombasa, Kenya, spending the first six years of his childhood at a refugee camp in Kakuma in northwestern Kenya. His family resettled in the United States in 2010, initially in Atlanta, but later in Seattle, where he attended Ballard High School. Bwana said "I fell in love with the game because my dad played it. My dad was a professional in Somalia". Describing how his childhood shaped him as a player, Bwana has stated that "playing with a garbage ball...made me better with my feet".

Career
Bwana joined the Seattle Sounders FC Academy in 2015.  On September 11, 2015, Bwana made his professional debut for USL club Seattle Sounders FC 2 in a 1–0 defeat to the Orange County Blues. He spent two seasons at the University of Washington.

Bwana was signed by the Sounders MLS side as a Homegrown Player on January 11, 2018. Bwana made his debut for the club against expansion side Los Angeles FC as a substitute on March 4, 2018, an appearance which included a shot from outside the box that hit the crossbar. He started Seattle's CONCACAF Champions League quarterfinal tie against Mexican club Chivas three days later, but did not appear in the second leg in Guadalajara, as Seattle lost 3–1 on aggregate. Bwana started his first MLS game against FC Dallas on March 18, 2018, a 3–0 defeat. His first goal was on May 9, 2018, the game winner against Toronto FC, and scored again a week later against Orlando City SC.

The Sounders traded Bwana to Nashville SC on October 21, 2020, in exchange for Jimmy Medranda and $225,000 of General Allocation Money.

On August 19, 2022, Bwana joined USL Championship side Memphis 901 on loan for the remainder of the 2022 season.

On January 10, 2023, Bwana and Nashville mutually agreed to part ways. The following day, the player officially joined USL Championship side Charleston Battery on a free transfer.

Career statistics

Club

Honours
Seattle Sounders FC
MLS Cup: 2019

Notes

References

External links
USSF Development Academy bio

1998 births
Living people
Sportspeople from Mombasa
Soccer players from Atlanta
Soccer players from Seattle
Washington Huskies men's soccer players
Tacoma Defiance players
Seattle Sounders FC players
Nashville SC players
Association football forwards
USL Championship players
Major League Soccer players
Homegrown Players (MLS)
Memphis 901 FC players
Charleston Battery players
American sportspeople of African descent
Somalian refugees
Refugees in Kenya
Kenyan people of Somali descent
American people of Somali descent